The Wuhu–Hefei Expressway, commonly referred to as the Wuhe Expressway is an expressway that connects Wuhu, Anhui, China and Hefei, Anhui. It is a spur of G50 Shanghai–Chongqing Expressway and is completely in Anhui Province.

References

Chinese national-level expressways
Expressways in Anhui